Growth hormone 2 (GH2), also known more commonly as placental growth hormone (PGH) or growth hormone variant (GH-V), is a protein that in humans is encoded by the GH2 gene. It is produced by and secreted from the placenta during pregnancy, and becomes the predominant form of growth hormone (GH) in the body during this time. Its cogener is growth hormone 1 (GH1), or pituitary growth hormone.

The protein encoded by this gene is a member of the somatotropin/prolactin family of hormones, playing an important role in growth control. The gene, along with four other related genes, is located at the growth hormone locus on chromosome 17, where they are interspersed in the same transcriptional orientation; an arrangement that is thought to have evolved through a series of gene duplications. The five genes share a remarkably high degree of sequence identity. Alternative splicing generates additional isoforms of each of the five growth hormones, leading to further diversity and the potential for specialization. As in the case of its pituitary counterpart, growth hormone 1, the predominant isoform of this particular family member shows similar somatogenic activity with reduced lactogenic activity. Mutations in this gene lead to placental growth hormone/lactogen deficiency.

See also
 Growth hormone
 Somatotropin family

References

Further reading

External links 
 

Hormones of the pregnant female
Hormones of the somatotropic axis